The Black prince copepod (Gaussia princeps) is a mesopelagic copepod found in temperate and tropical waters worldwide. They have been known to display bioluminescence.

Gaussia princeps is used in the production of luciferase.

References

Calanoida
Crustaceans of the Atlantic Ocean
Crustaceans described in 1894
Bioluminescent copepods